Michael Larsen (born 16 October 1969) is a Danish former football player, who played in the midfielder position. He played two games for the Denmark national football team in 1993, and represented Denmark at the 1992 Summer Olympics football tournament. He played his entire club career for Silkeborg IF, and won the 1994 Danish Superliga championship and 2001 Danish Cup tournament with the club.

External links
Danish national team profile
DanskFodbold.com profile

1969 births
Living people
Danish men's footballers
Footballers from Odense
Denmark international footballers
Silkeborg IF players
Danish Superliga players
Association football midfielders
Olympic footballers of Denmark
Footballers at the 1992 Summer Olympics